The Texas Bearcat is a 1925 American silent Western film directed by B. Reeves Eason and starring Bob Custer. It was distributed by Film Booking Offices of America.

Plot

Cast
 Bob Custer as Dave Sethman
 Sally Rand as Jean Crawford
 Harry von Meter as John Crawford
 Jack Richardson as Watson
 Carlton S. King as Sethman
 Lee Shumway as Murdock

Preservation
With no copies of The Texas Bearcat located in any film archives, it is a lost film.

References

External links

 
 

1925 films
Lost American films
Film Booking Offices of America films
Lost Western (genre) films
1925 Western (genre) films
American black-and-white films
1925 lost films
Silent American Western (genre) films
Films directed by B. Reeves Eason
Films with screenplays by George H. Plympton
1920s American films